Stephen Hospital is a cottage hospital in Dufftown, Moray, Scotland. It is managed by NHS Grampian.

History 
The hospital was endowed by George Stephen, 1st Baron Mount Stephen, the entrepreneur behind the creation of the Canadian Pacific Railway. The hospital opened in 1890 and was extended by the addition of a second wing in 1984 and a purpose built health centre in 1976.

Services
The hospital has 20 beds providing medical care, rehabilitation, assessment, palliative/terminal care, and convalescence. It also has a 24-hour minor injuries unit.

References

NHS Grampian
NHS Scotland hospitals
Hospital buildings completed in 1890
Hospital buildings completed in 1984
Hospitals in Moray
Buildings and structures in Moray
1890 establishments in Scotland
Hospitals established in 1890
Cottage hospitals
Dufftown